Sarah Cunningham may refer to:
 Sarah Cunningham (actress) (1918–1986), American actress
 Sarah Jane Cunningham (born 1967), British-born American television writer and producer